The 1985 Furman Paladins football team was an American football team that represented Furman University as a member of the Southern Conference (SoCon) during the 1985 NCAA Division I-AA football season. In their eighth year under head coach Dick Sheridan, the Paladins compiled an overall record of 12–2 with a conference mark of 6–0, winning the SoCon title. Furman advanced to the NCAA Division I-AA Football Championship playoffs, where they defeated Rhode Island in the quarterfinals, Nevada in the semifinals, and were upset by Georgia Southern in the NCAA Division I-AA Championship Game.

Schedule

A.Before the start of the season, Southern Conference directors elected to make this game count as a conference game for Davidson, but not for Furman.

References

Furman
Furman Paladins football seasons
Southern Conference football champion seasons
Furman Paladins football